Peter Barakan (born 20 August 1951, in London, England) is an English-born DJ, freelance experienced broadcaster, and an author of books on music and English language education. He is best known as the presenter of Begin Japanology and Japanology Plus on NHK World. In Japan, he is known as the radio host of "Barakan Beat" on InterFM, "Weekend Sunshine" on NHK FM, and Lifestyle Museum on Tokyo FM. Barakan also curates "Live Magic!", presented by CreativeMan Productions, Tower Records, and InterFM. It is a two-day festival intent on promoting obscure western artists to a wider Japanese audience.

Early life 
Peter Barakan was born and raised in London, England to an Anglo-Burmese mother and a Jewish father of Polish ancestry, with his younger brother, musician Shane Fontayne. After attending Junior High School, he graduated from SOAS, University of London.

Career

Early Career (1974–1988) 
Barakan moved to Tokyo, Japan in early 1974, after accepting a job offer as a clerk at a music publishing company in Japan. In the early 80's, after his departure as a clerk, Barakan began contributing to magazines and hosting a radio show as a freelancer, as well as writing lyrics and handling international marketing for the Japanese band Yellow Magic Orchestra. In October 1988, with his start as host of the late-night weekly TBS program, “CBS Document”(a Japanese edition of 60 Minutes), Barakan’s popularity grew, especially among Japanese eager to study English and Americans starved for broadcasts from their home country.

Radio (1980–present) 
Barakan was the host for a radio show in Roppongi for approximately 9 years. Starting in 1996, he was a host for 3-hour slot named "Barakan Morning " on InterFM radio which ended in 2011.

He is currently hosting "Barakan Beat", a live show on InterFM, "Weekend Sunshine", a freestyle program on NHK FM, and Lifestyle Museum, 30-minute weekly interview programme on Tokyo FM.

Television (2003–present) 
Barakan’s broadcast experience eventually led him to NHK’s Japanology in 2003, where he is more well known internationally for exploring aspects of traditional and contemporary Japan, including interviews with experts in various fields. As the show progressed, he eventually became the sole presenter where he is more able to express his creative freedoms.

He also acts as a presenter alongside his Japanese co-host for Offbeat & Jazz, a monthly show on satellite broadcaster WOWOW, featuring live performances by mainly jazz artists.

Social issues 
During the 2011 Fukushima Daiichi nuclear disaster, Barakan was prevented from playing a nuclear protest song, because it could "create 'fuhyou higai''', which means 'damage from rumors'".

Similarly, in 2014, Barakan was pressured by two broadcast stations (other than InterFM) to steer clear of commenting on nuclear power issues.

In 2012, he led a U.N. sponsored multi-city mayoral panel discussion on community rebuilding following the 2011 Tōhoku earthquake and tsunami.

 Personal life 
He is currently married to Mayumi Yoshida, a translator, and is the father of a college boy and high school girl.

 Filmography 

 Film 

 Television 

 Bibliography 

 Taking Stock (2020)
 新版魂（ソウル）のゆくえ (2019)
 Cotton Fields (2020)
 ロックの英詞を読む―世界を変える歌 (2016)
 ピーター・バラカンのわが青春のサウンドトラック (2013)
 ピーター・バラカン音楽日記 (2011)
 ラジオのこちら側で (2013)
 ぼくが愛するロック名盤２４０ (1998)
 ジャズ・ロックのおかげです (1994)
 200CD ピーター・バラカン選 ブラック・ミュージック (2009)
 ピーター・バラカンのわが青春のサウンドトラック (2009)
 猿はマンキ　お金はマニ (2009)
 魂（ソウル）のゆくえ (2008)
 ロックの英詞を読む (2003)
 Love Songs – A Kiss Is Just A Kiss (1993)
 ミュージック捜査線 (1993)
 魂（ソウル）のゆくえ (1989; republished in 2008)

References

External links
 "Japanese viewers may want their MTV, but they won't be getting it". Rocky Mountain News. 25 June 1991. Billboard''
Peter Barakan on IMDb

1951 births
Living people
English writers about music
British emigrants to Japan
British people of Burmese descent
British people of Polish-Jewish descent
Writers from London
Japanese DJs
Japanese television personalities
Japanese radio personalities
British expatriates in Japan
Japanese people of Anglo-Burmese descent
Japanese people of Polish-Jewish descent
English male non-fiction writers